The Furnace Creek Fault Zone (FCFZ) is a geological fault that is located in Eastern California and southwestern Nevada. The northern segment of the FCFZ is also referred to as the Fish Lake Valley Fault Zone. The FCFZ is considered an integral part of the Walker Lane.

References

Additional reading
Baucke, W.; Cemen, I., Strike-Slip displacement along the Furnace Creek Fault Zone, southern Basins and Ranges, Death Valley, California, American Geophysical Union, Fall Meeting 2007, abstract #T31C-0594

Amargosa Desert
Death Valley National Park
Geology of Inyo County, California
Natural history of Inyo County, California
Natural history of Nye County, Nevada
Natural history of the Mojave Desert
Seismic faults of California
Seismic faults of Nevada
Strike-slip faults